Te Paea can refer to:
 Te Paea o Hauraki Marae, a tribal meeting ground at Kennedy Bay for Ngāti Tamaterā
 Sophia Hinerangi (c.1834–1911), a Maori tourist guide and temperance leader
 Te Paea Cherrington (c.1878–1937) a New Zealand tribal leader of Maori descent